Pierre Geoffroy (September 05, 1939 – October 14, 1994) was a French sports journalist and coach.

Biography

Pierre Geoffroy was a sports journalist for L'Union, who placed an advertisement in July 1968, looking for female football players to organize a football match as part of the newspaper fair. This section led to formation of Stade de Reims Féminines. He was the first France women's national football team coach in the first FIFA sanctioned women's international against the Netherlands on April 17, 1971. He coached France at the 1971 Women's World Cup.

Personal life

Geoffroy was married to French footballer Maryse Lesieur.

References

1939 births
1994 deaths
People from Reims
French sports journalists
Deaths from lymphoma
French football managers
Female association football managers
France women's national football team managers